Yoon Seok-hyun (born September 4, 1983) is a South Korean actor. Yoon started acting on stage with musicals and plays. He is best known for his role in television drama Hometown Cha-Cha-Cha (2021) and Big Mouth (2022).

Career 
Yoon Seok-hyun was born on September 4, 1983, in Iksan, Jeollabuk-do, South Korea.  Yoon attended Wonkwang High School, where he was member of the baseball club. In the same time, an acting academy opened in the city. Yoon enrolled in the academy and started learning acting and also dreamed of becoming a singer. Following his graduation from high school, Yoon enrolled in Department of Acting Arts in Digital Seoul University of Culture and Arts. After graduation, he went to Department of Musical, Kyungmin University, Gyeonggi Province where he graduated with Bachelor in Musical.

In 2004, while attending Kyungmin University, Yoon made his debut as rapper Mingyu in premiere of musical Sonagi or Rain Shower (소나기). Although it was a small role, his image was strong. This work, about a vague memory of first love, is based on the novel of the same name by Hwang Soon-won and directed by Yoo Hee-seong. Yoon also got small roles in MBC musical I forgot his name (그 사람 이름은 잊었지만). In 2005 he was cast in musical Love Quilt (러브퀼트).

In 2007, Yoon joined children play The Dwarf who love Snow White. He did dual roles as both prince and dwarf flower dew. Since its premiere in May 2001 in The '2001 Seoul Children's and Youth Performing Arts Festival', it has been well-received by the audience and critics, and has sold out all and all seats every year. As repertoire of U Theater Company, it was directed by Park Seung-geol, a co-author of the novel The Dwarf who Loved Snow White.

In 2008, He was cast as in an ensemble role in musical Sound Thief (2008). Yoon worked consistently as musical actors for four years. His other significant credits include supporting roles appearances in musical Hello Francesca (2008), the brothers were brave (2009), Singles (2009), oh! While you're asleep (2010), Bachelor's Vegetable Shop 2.0, (2010), Monte Cristo (2011), and Special Letter (2011).

In 2012, Yoon finally got his first leading role through a fierce audition in a musical Proposal (2012). With fellow actor Jung Uk-jin, Yoon won the role of Min-ho, a non-regular sports center instructor, with 200 to 1 competition ratio. In the same year, Yoon also won audition to join the sixth season of the open-run musical Finding Mr. Destiny for lead role Kim Jong-wook.

After six years, Yoon back to theater his first second play Puzzle (2013), Korean adaptation of play Point of Death by British writer Michael Cooney. Yoon Seok-hyun alternately performed as supporting role Travis, with two fellow actors Won Jong-hwan and Park Ki-duk. It was performed from September 7 to November 17, 2013 in Daehak-ro Happy Theater.

In 2015, Yoon debuted in television with minor roles in JTBC drama Last. In 2017, he got his first role in thriller film Missing 2 as Koo Sang-woo.

In 2018, Yoon auditioned for Musical Dwarf directed by Kim Dong-yeon. He got role as Dwarf Charlie.

Few years later in 2021, through audition Yoon got his first supporting role in tvN drama Hometown Cha-Cha-Cha as Choi Geum-cheol, Du-sik's best friend and Bo-ra's father. After the drama, Yoon signed an exclusive contract with D-Plan Entertainment, signaling the start of active activities in small screen.

Personal life 
On January 17, 2023, it announced that Yoon and announcer Jung In-young got married in Seoul on 8th, after a year of dating.

Filmographies

Film

Television

Stage

Musical

Theater

References

External links 

 
 Yoon Seok-hyun at Daum Encyclopedia 
 Yoon Seok-hyun at playDB 
 Yoon Seok-hyun at Naver 
 

1983 births
Living people
People from Iksan
21st-century South Korean male actors
Male actors from Seoul
South Korean male actors
South Korean male musical theatre actors
South Korean male stage actors
South Korean male television actors